Strathcona County is a specialized municipality in the Edmonton Metropolitan Region within Alberta, Canada between Edmonton and Elk Island National Park. It forms part of Census Division No. 11.

Strathcona County is both urban and rural in nature. Approximately  of its population lives in Sherwood Park, which is an urban service area east of Edmonton remains an unincorporated hamlet. The balance lives beyond Sherwood Park within a rural service area.

History 
In Treaty 6, the First Nations ceded their title to the land that would become Strathcona County. Local governance began in 1893 when the North-West Territorial Legislature established an area east of Edmonton as Statute Labour District No. 2. It then grew in size over the following decade and was renamed Local Improvement District (LID) No. 517 in 1913. In 1918, LID No. 517 became a municipal district under the name of the Municipal District (MD) of Clover Bar No. 517. At the same time, the neighbouring LID No. 518 to the south became the MD of Strathcona No. 518.

The MD of Clover Bar No. 517 and the MD of Strathcona No. 518 amalgamated on March 1, 1943, into a larger municipal district under the name of the MD of Strathcona No. 517. It was subsequently renumbered as the MD of Strathcona No. 83 in 1945. Upon further amalgamating with the Clover Bar School Division No. 13, the MD of Strathcona No. 83 incorporated as a county under the name of the County of Strathcona No. 20 on January 1, 1962. Its county status reverted to municipal district status in 1995 when the County Act was repealed by the provincial legislature though its name remained County of Strathcona No. 20. Its name was officially changed to Strathcona County on April 26, 1995. Shortly thereafter, Strathcona County's status was changed from municipal district to specialized municipality on January 1, 1996.

The purpose of Strathcona County's change to specialized municipality status was to provide "for the unique needs of a municipality that includes both a large urban centre and a significant rural territory and population." The status change specifically designated Strathcona County's large urban centre, Sherwood Park, as an urban service area deemed equivalent to a city. Its remaining rural territory was specifically designated a rural service area deemed equivalent to a municipal district.

Geography 
Strathcona County is in the central portion of the province of Alberta and forms the eastern portion of the Edmonton Metropolitan Region. It borders Lamont County to the northeast, Improvement District No. 13 (Elk Island National Park) to the east, Beaver County to the southeast, Leduc County to the south, the City of Edmonton to the west, the City of Fort Saskatchewan to the northeast, and Sturgeon County to the north. The North Saskatchewan River forms its municipal boundary with Sturgeon County. Some of its water bodies include Cooking Lake, Half Moon, and Hastings Lake.

Communities and localities 

 
The following urban municipalities are surrounded by Strathcona County.
Cities
Fort Saskatchewan
Towns
none
Villages
none
Summer villages
none

The following hamlets are located within Strathcona County.
Hamlets
Antler Lake
Ardrossan
Collingwood Cove
Half Moon Lake
Hastings Lake
Josephburg
North Cooking Lake
Sherwood Park (urban service area)
South Cooking Lake
The following localities are located within Strathcona County.
Localities

Adam Lily Acres
Akenside
Akenside Estates
Arddmoor-Rosswood
Ardmoor
Artesian Estates
Aspen Heights
Aspen View
Aurora Place
Avery Park
Ball Meadows
Baronwood
Beaver Brook Estates
Beaver Valley Estates
Beck Estates
Belvedere Heights
Belvedere Heights East
Belvedere Heights West
Berry Hill
Best Estates
Beverly Hills
Birch Park
Birchwood Village
Brecken Woods
Bremner
Bretona
Bretville Junction
Bristol Estates
Brookville Estates
Busenius Estates
Calebo Estates
Camelot Square
Campbelltown
Campbelltown Heights
Carriage Lane
Caswellem
Century Estates
Century Meadows
Chrenek Acres
Chrenek Estates
Claireridge Estates
Clarkdale Meadows
Clover Bar
Cloverlea
Colonel Younger Estates
Colonial Estates
Cooking Lake
Country Club Estates
Craigavon
Cranston Place
Croftland
Dasmarinas Estates
Deer Horn Estates
Deville
Dixon Crescent
Dixon Place
Donaldson Park
Dowling Estates
Dunbar
East Edmonton
East Whitecroft
Easton Acres
Eastwood Estates
Elk Island
Elkland Estates
Executive Estates
Farrell Estates
Farrell Properties
Forest Hills Country Estates
Fulham Park
Galloway Park Subdivision
Garden Estates
Garden Heights
Glenwood Park Estates
Good Hope
Graham Heights
Gray Drive Estates
Greenbrae
Greenhaven
Greenhaven Estates
Greenwood Estates
Griesbach
Gunnmanor
Half Moon Estates
Hanson Estates
Hercules
Heritage Hills
High Ridge Place
Highroad Estates
Hillsdale
Hillside Park
Holland Subdivision
Horton Place
Hulbert Crescent
Hunter Heights
Hunter Hill Estates
Hyland Hills
Ireland Subdivision
Ithacan Drive
Jidaro Valley Subdivision
Keding Estates
Lakeland Village
Lakeland Village Trailer Park
Lakeview
Lakeview Estates
Lakewood Acres
Lark Hill Farms
Las Villas
Laurina Estates
Levder's Ridge Subdivision
Lina Country Estates
Lincoln Green
Lindale
Lindale Park
Lindberg
Lueder Ridge
Lynley Ridge
Mark Iv Estates
Marler Subdivision
Marvin Gardens
McConnell Estates
Meadow Court
Meadow Land Estates
Meadowbrook Heights
Meyers Lakeshore Estates
Midway Estates
Military Point
Miniskic Estates
Newton Estates
North Queensdale Place
Ordze Park and Wye Road Garden
Parker Ridge
Parklane Estates
Parkside Estates
Parkview Ridge
Parkwood Place
Partridge Hill
Paso Valley Subdivision
Patricia Estates
Pebble Court
Penridge Estates
Pine Grove Acres
Pleasant View
Pleasantview Acreages
Pointe Aux Pins Estates
Poplar Lake Estates
Portas Gardens
Queensdale Place
Quesnel Country Estates
Regency Park Estates
Reno-Ville
Richlyn Estates
Rolling Forest Estates
Roman Estates
Rose Burn Estate
Rossbrooke Estates
Royal Estates
Royal Gardens
Ryedale Estates
Sconadale
Sconaglen Estates
Scot Haven
Scotford
Shady Lanes
Sherwood Place
Sierra Grand Estates
Silver Birch Hills
Simmons
Simpson Grange
Smithson Acres
South Bailey
South Queensdale Place
Springhill Estate
Spruce Bend Estate
Summerwood
Sun Hill Estates
Tanglewood Estates
Tidan Heights
Trans Oak Estates
Trevithick
Trevithick Subdivision
Twin Island Air Park
Uncas
Valley Point
Verden Place
Voyageur Estates
Wellington Estates
West Whitecroft
Westpark Estates
Whitecroft
Wildwood Village
Williams Park
Willow Lake Estates
Willowdale Estates
Winfield Heights
Woodland Downs
Woodland Park
Woodville Estates
Wye Haven
Wye Knott Village
Wyeclif
Wyeknot Village

Demographics 

Ethnicity 

Note: Totals greater than 100% due to multiple origin responses.

Economy 
Industrial
Strathcona County has over $12.0 billion worth of industrial projects completed, announced, or under construction. This is aided in part by the concentration of oil refineries on the west side of Sherwood Park. This district, known as Refinery Row, includes some of the largest industrial facilities in Western Canada, such as Imperial's Strathcona Refinery. Originally built in the 1940s, a new refinery was constructed in 1976 and is one of the largest refining facilities in Canada. As well, the Suncor's Edmonton Refinery produces  of gasoline, diesel, jet fuel, and aviation gasoline. This refinery sits on 247 hectares of land and has been operating for over 65 years.
A founding member of Alberta's Industrial Heartland, Strathcona County is home to Canada's largest hydrocarbon refining cluster.

The leading industries in Strathcona County  are extraction, manufacturing, scientific, construction, trucking and engineering.

Commercial
Strathcona County is home to more than 11,000 businesses, with 3,500 of those businesses comprising employees. A market area population of 1.4 million has resulted in household spending power of $5.6 billion. Strathcona County has over 15,800 highly-skilled graduates available with 94% of residents holding a diploma, certificate, or degree. 
Within the active business community, there are several resources available to local entrepreneurs to help support their businesses:
 Small Business Week and Conference
 Business Visitation Program
 Business Startup Seminars and Support
 Business Planning and Site Selection Resources

Arts and culture 

Strathcona County Library is a publicly funded library with its main branch in Sherwood Park. Its bookmobile provides service to rural residents through 14 regular weekly stops.

Attractions 
Elk Island National Park is adjacent to Strathcona County to the east.

Government 
Unlike most Albertan municipal districts, where council appoints a reeve, Strathcona County elects a mayor. Rod Frank was elected in 2017, replacing Roxanne Carr who was elected in 2013.

Infrastructure 
Airports
Strathcona County is home to two public airports. Cooking Lake Airport, which operates as a condo board, accommodates 87 per cent of Strathcona County's public aeronautical transportation needs. It is also the oldest operating public airport in Canada and approved for international flights under the Canada Border Services Agency CANPASS program.

The Warren Thomas Aerodrome, better known as the Josephburg Airport, serves the remaining 13 per cent of Strathcona County's public aeronautical transportation needs.

Roads
The following provincial highways service Strathcona County.

 (Poundmaker Highway)

 (Yellowhead Highway route of Trans-Canada Highway)

 (Sherwood Park Freeway)
 (Anthony Henday Drive)

 (Wye Road)

Transit

Sports
Strathcona Druids RFC

See also 
List of communities in Alberta
List of municipalities in Alberta
List of specialized municipalities in Alberta

Notes

References

External links 

 
1943 establishments in Alberta
Edmonton Metropolitan Region
Specialized municipalities in Alberta